Arab Dutch (Arabische Nederlanders), also referred to as Dutch Arabs (Nederlandse Arabieren), are citizens or residents of the Netherlands whose ancestry traces back to the Arab World.

Politics
In 2001, two Arab immigrants to the Netherlands, Egyptian-born Farouk Ibrahim (58) and Moroccan-born Mustafa Aboustib, set up the Arab Democratic Party (Arabische Democratische Partij), complaining that Arabs were not well represented in mainstream political parties except as "pretty Arab faces". In 2007, a group of Arab Dutch complained about the television network Al Jazeera's effective monopoly on Arabic broadcasting in the country.

Notable people

Khadija Arib, politician
Maryam Hassouni, actress
Laïla Abid, journalist
Ali B, rapper
Badr Hari, super heavyweight kickboxer
R3hab, DJ and electronic musician
Ramses Shaffy, singer
Hany Abu-Assad, film director
Arjan El Fassed, politician
Ramsey Nasr, writer
Kim Ghattas, journalist
Karim Rekik, footballer
 Marouan Azarkan
Mohamed Al-Daradji, film director.
 Mohamed Ihattaren
Mohamed Mallahi
 Mounir El Hamdaoui
 Naoufal Bannis
Osama Rashid, footballer
Imaan Hammam, fashion model
Yes-R, Dutch rapper
Amir Zeyada, kickboxer
Youssef Idilbi, Dutch actor
Marwan Kenzari, actor
Mourad Bouzidi, kickboxer
Karim Bridji, footballer
Rania Zeriri, singer
Rodaan Al Galidi, writer
Mariwan Kanie, writer
Ibrahim Afellay, footballer
Fouad Idabdelhay, footballer
 Tahseen Jabbary
 Yassine Azzagari
 Younes Taha
 Zakaria Labyad
 Zakaria Aboukhlal
 Mo Hamdaoui
 Ismaïl Aissati
 Redouan El Yaakoubi
 Anwar El Ghazi

See also
Arab European League
Arab diaspora
Arabs in Europe
Moroccan-Dutch
Egyptians in the Netherlands
Iraqis in the Netherlands
Berbers in the Netherlands
Lebanese diaspora
Syrian diaspora
Palestinian diaspora
Moroccan diaspora
Iraqi diaspora
Egyptian diaspora

References

External links
T-shirt project in the Netherlands to create understanding between the Arab Dutch and non-Arab Dutch

 
Arab diaspora in Europe
 
Middle Eastern diaspora in the Netherlands
Ethnic groups in the Netherlands
Muslim communities in Europe